Northumberland Archives holds the archives for the county of Northumberland. The archives are held at Woodhorn and Berwick-upon-Tweed and run by Northumberland County Council.

References

County record offices in England
Northumberland
History of Northumberland